Inspiration #1 is the first Japanese studio album of South Korean boy band Shinhwa. It was released on 16 August 2006. State Of The Art peaked at #4 on the Oricon Chart in Japan and sold over 100,000 copies.

Tracks
Information is adapted from the liner notes of Inspiration #1:

Pre-Inspiration #1
After releasing State Of The Art, Shinhwa quickly began preparing their first Japanese album and single.  As preparation work for their Japanese album release, Shinhwa held a press conference in Japan on April 14, 2006, in addition to performing at MNET's anniversary celebration in Japan on April 15, 2006. The press conference came as a result of Shinhwa's effort to break into the Japanese market, with the release of their first Japanese language single There is Sun in Our Hearts on June 14, 2006, debuting at #9 on the Oricon Chart, and their first official album, Inspiration #1, in Japan in August, debuting at #4, both selling 100,000 copies.

Chart performance

Release history

References

2006 albums
Shinhwa albums